The 1921 Stanley Cup Finals was contested by the National Hockey League (NHL) champion Ottawa Senators and the Pacific Coast Hockey Association (PCHA) champion Vancouver Millionaires. The Senators defeated Vancouver three games to two in the best-of-five game series to become the first team to win back-to-back Cup championships since the 1912/1913 Quebec Bulldogs.

Paths to the Finals
Ottawa won the first half of the 1920–21 NHL regular season while the Toronto St. Patricks won the second half, setting up a two-game total goals series between the two clubs to determine the NHL title. The Senators recorded 5–0 and 2–0 shutout victories to advance to the Cup final. The first NHL players strike almost took place before the second game when Toronto's players balked at playing extra games. However, team manager Charlie Querrie agreed to give the players a bonus for the playoffs.

Meanwhile, Vancouver finished the 1920–21 PCHA regular season in first place with a 13–11 record, and defeated the second place Seattle Metropolitans in a championship series to win the PCHA title.

Game summaries
The series took place at Vancouver's Denman Arena, where the attendance per game during the series averaged over 10,000 people. The attendance for the first game was 11,000, setting a new world record for the largest crowd to see a hockey game, only to be topped in the fifth game. The Millionaires won games one and four with victories of 3–1 and 3–2, respectively. The Senators were victorious in games two and three with 4–3 and 3–2 wins. Then in the fifth game, Jack Darragh scored both of Ottawa's goals in the 2–1 victory to clinch the Cup.

In game one, played under western rules of seven-men hockey, the Millionaires took a 2–0 lead after the first period on goals by Alf Skinner and Art Duncan. Smokey Harris scored in the second to stretch the lead to 3–0 before Darragh put Ottawa on the board with five minutes to play in the second. The third period was scoreless, giving the first win and the series lead to the Millionaires. Skinner was badly cut in the game and was sent to the hospital.

In game two, played under eastern rules of six-man hockey, the Millionaires took the lead 3–2 after one period on goals by Harris, Duncan and Jack Adams. Ottawa tied it the second on a goal by Darragh. Punch Broadbent scored the winning goal with four minutes to play in the third period.

Game three was again played under western rules. Skinner remained out. Lloyd Cook opened the scoring for Vancouver in the second minute but Darragh countered for Ottawa five minutes later. Ottawa took the lead in the second with goals by Cy Denneny and Sprague Cleghorn before Jack Adams countered for Vancouver seven minutes later. Ottawa held off the Millionaires with a strong defensive third period to win the game and take the series lead.

Game four was played under eastern rules. The first period was scoreless. Skinner put Vancouver ahead early in the second but Boucher tied it up for Ottawa and the teams entered the third period tied 1–1. In the third, Skinner scored again and Cook scored to put Vancouver up by two goals. Broadbent scored for Ottawa a minute later. Vancouver held off the Senators to win the game and tie the series.

In the fifth and deciding game, it was estimated that 12,000 attended and 3,000 were turned away. Skinner scored to put Vancouver up 1–0 after the first period. Darragh scored twice for Ottawa in the second period to put the Senators ahead with one period to play. With two minutes to play, Cook was body-checked by Eddie Gerard and retaliated. Cleghorn then decked Cook with a punch to the jaw and a free-for-all broke out, only ended by the police going onto the ice. The three were penalized and Ottawa finished the game with five players, while Vancouver finished with six. Ottawa held on to win the game 2–1 and the series and retained the championship. After the game, the teams exchanged sweaters and much of the Ottawas' equipment was taken away by souvenir hunters.

Darragh led the Senators in scoring with five goals during the series, while goaltender Clint Benedict only allowed just 12 goals in the five games, earning a 2.40 goals-against average. Since all games were played in Vancouver, the three wins by the Senators meant they were the first team to win three road games in a Final series. Darragh had had to get special permission from his job with Ottawa Dairy Company, at the request of Ottawa mayor Frank Plant, to play in the final. Alf Skinner led the scoring for Vancouver with four goals. It was the final Stanley Cup series for Cyclone Taylor. 

Vancouver coach Frank Patrick remarked after the series: "You have the greatest team I have ever saw. Ottawa ought to be proud of those boys. Their defensive system is marvellous. They are better than the 'Little Men of Iron', the 'Silver Seven' or any other sextet I have ever watched. It was no disgrace to lose to that aggregation."

Stanley Cup engraving
The 1921 Stanley Cup was presented by the trophy's trustee William Foran. The Senators never did engrave their name on the Cup for their championship season.

It was not until the trophy was redesigned in 1948 that the words "1921 Ottawa Senators" was put onto its then-new collar.

The following Senators players and staff were members of the Stanley Cup winning team.

1920–21 Ottawa Senators

See also
 1920–21 NHL season
 1920–21 PCHA season

References

 

Notes

Stanley Cup Finals
Stan
Stan
Stanley
1921
Ottawa Senators (original) games
March 1921 sports events
April 1921 sports events
Ice hockey competitions in Vancouver
1920s in Vancouver
1921 in British Columbia